Krisztofer Szerető (born 10 January 2000) is a Hungarian football player who plays for Nyíregyháza.

Career

Ferencváros
On 6 April 2019, Szerető played his first match for Ferencváros in a 3-0 win against Paksi FC in the Hungarian League.

On 16 June 2020, he became champion with Ferencváros by beating Budapest Honvéd FC at the Hidegkuti Nándor Stadion on the 30th match day of the 2019–20 Nemzeti Bajnokság I season.

Nyíregyháza
On 8 June 2022, Szerető signed with Nyíregyháza.

Club statistics

Updated to games played as of 4 December 2019.

References

External links

2000 births
Footballers from Budapest
Living people
Hungarian footballers
Hungary youth international footballers
Association football midfielders
Csepel SC footballers
Budapest Honvéd FC players
Stoke City F.C. players
Ferencvárosi TC footballers
Soroksár SC players
Nyíregyháza Spartacus FC players
Nemzeti Bajnokság I players
Nemzeti Bajnokság II players
Hungarian expatriate footballers
Expatriate footballers in England
Hungarian expatriate sportspeople in England